Sand Creek High School is located in Colorado Springs, Colorado, United States, and is the second high school of Falcon School District 49. The school was built in 1997.

Athletics 

Sand Creek High School is a member of the Pikes Peak Athletic Conference, Class 4A. It competes in men's football, cross country, soccer, golf, tennis, basketball, wrestling, track, and baseball; and women's softball, cross country, volleyball, basketball, track, soccer, golf, and tennis. They also participate in marching band competitions, with their band reaching the semi-finals on the state level in 2007.

References

External links 
 

High schools in Colorado Springs, Colorado
Educational institutions established in 1996
Public high schools in Colorado
International Baccalaureate schools in Colorado
1996 establishments in Colorado